The Liberal Alliance (FISY; , , ΦΙ.ΣΥ.) is a liberal political party in Greece, founded in February 2007. Its stated purpose is to cover the political ground between what it considers to constitute a conservative New Democracy and the socialist PASOK.

The highest organ in Liberal Alliance is its bi-annual congress, which elects a seven member Coordination Committee. The CC then elects the President.

Liberal Alliance's founding document is the Proclamation of Anavissos, written on 28 April 2007.  It contains a reference to Victor Hugo.

The symbol of Liberal Alliance is like @ but instead of 'a' it has the Greek phi letter, which is also the first letter of the word 'liberal' in the Greek language, while the dominating colours are purple and yellow. Initially the logo was the head of Adamantios Korais, until the first party congress.

History 

The party participated in the 2007 legislative election in Greece, where it tallied 0,1% of the popular vote, ranking 13th among 21 candidate parties. Its highest percentage was in the first Athens electoral prefecture, where it tallied 544 votes out of 337.000 cast, equaling 0,17%, while its worst percentage was in the prefecture of Pieria, which is the only prefecture where the party fielded no candidates.

It also participated in the 2009 European Parliament elections, with an even lower tally of 0,08% of the popular vote, ranking 24th among 27 candidate parties. The results of the 2009 European Parliament election, considered as catastrophic, led the party to not participate in the 2009 general elections in Greece, held three months later.

In the 2010 local elections Liberal Alliance participated through the 'Portokali' (meaning "orange" colour) movement in Giorgos Kaminis's 'Dikaioma stin poli' coalition, who won the mayorship of Athens.

In the May 2012 election to the Hellenic Parliament, Liberal Alliance ran in electoral alliance with Drasi. It won 1.8% of the vote. In the June 2012 election, they additionally joined up with Recreate Greece but with just 1.59% of the votes again did not manage to surpass the 3% electoral threshold.

In January 2015, the Liberal Alliance suspended talks about a joint electoral list in the upcoming legislative election with social-liberal To Potami party. The aspired "front against the new two-party system of statists" did not fail on the "serious ideological differences" with To Potami, but on the grounds that the participation of Liberal Alliance's president Gregory Vallianatos had reportedly been ruled out by To Potami, which instead decided to team up with Liberal Alliance's 2012 partner, Drasi.

People 
The following people are associated with Liberal Alliance:
 President: Despoina Limniotaki
 Former President: Makis Spyratos
 Former President: Gregory Vallianatos
 Former President: Giorgos Sarigiannidis
 Former President: Fotis Perlikos

See also 
 Liberalism in Greece
 The Liberals (Greece), Greek political party

References

External links 
 Liberal Alliance website (in Greek)

Political parties established in 2007
Classical liberal parties
Liberal parties in Greece
Neoliberal parties in Greece
Secular parties in Greece
2007 establishments in Greece